Steeven is a given name. Notable people with the name include:

Steeven Joseph-Monrose (born 1990), French footballer
Steeven Langil (born 1988), French footballer
Steeven Petitteville (born 1974), French cinematographer

See also
Steevens
Stephen

https://en.wikipedia.org/w/index.php?title=Steeven&action=edit#